Moltkestraße is a light rail station on the Cologne Stadtbahn lines 1 and 7, located in the Neustadt of Cologne. The station's two platforms lie at Moltkestraße, though one block apart from each other. The platform for inbound (downtown) trains lies at Richard-Wagner-Straße, the platform for outbound trains at Aachener Straße. 

The station serves Cologne's Belgisches Viertel (Belgian Quarter).

See also 
 List of Cologne KVB stations

References

External links  

Cologne KVB stations
Innenstadt, Cologne